Combined track and field events are competitions in which athletes participate in a number of track and field events, earning points for their performance in each event, which adds to a total points score. Outdoors, the most common combined events are the men's decathlon and the women's heptathlon. Due to stadium limitations, indoor combined events competition have a reduced number of events, resulting in the men's heptathlon and the women's pentathlon. Athletes are allocated points based on an international-standard points scoring system, such as the decathlon scoring table. Other longer combined events do exist, such as the icosathlon (double decathlon) for men and the tetradecathlon for women. Indoors, both men and women compete in the tetradecathlon, with slightly different events to the women's outdoor version.

Various combined events

See also
 IAAF World Combined Events Challenge
 European Cup Combined Events
 Icosathlon

Notes and references

External links
 Decathlon at IAAF web site
 Heptathlon at IAAF web site

 
Track and field
Athletics by type